Frederick Hope may refer to:

 Fredric Hope (1900–1937), American art director
 Frederick William Hope (1797–1862), English entomologist